Álex López Morón and Albert Portas were the defending champions but only Portas competed that year with Germán Puentes.

Portas and Puentes lost in the first round to Giorgio Galimberti and Ion Moldovan.

Sergio Roitman and Andrés Schneiter won in the final 6–2, 7–5 against Ivan Ljubičić and Lovro Zovko.

Seeds
Champion seeds are indicated in bold text while text in italics indicates the round in which those seeds were eliminated.

 Tomáš Cibulec /  Leoš Friedl (semifinals)
 Albert Portas /  Germán Puentes (first round)
 Sergio Roitman /  Andrés Schneiter (champions)
 Petr Luxa /  Radek Štěpánek (semifinals)

Draw

External links
 2001 Croatia Open Doubles Draw

Croatia Open
2001 ATP Tour